Galinsoga macrocephala is a South American species of flowering plant in the family Asteraceae. It has been found only in Venezuela.

Description
Galinsoga macrocephala is a branching annual herb up to 30 (12 inches) tall. Stems are purple with white hairs. Each head has about 14 reddish-purple ray flowers surrounding about 25 yellow disc flowers.

References

macrocephala
Flora of Venezuela
Plants described in 1798